Nuragus (Latin: Valentia) is a small town, in administrative terms a comune (municipality), in the Province of South Sardinia in the Italian autonomous region of Sardinia, located about  north of the local capital Cagliari.

Nuragus borders the following municipalities: Genoni, Gesturi, Isili, Laconi, Nurallao.

Archaeology
Copper trade originating in the eastern Mediterranean in the Bronze Age kingdom of Alashiya (probably Cyprus) reached as far west as Sardinia, where five typical oxhide ingots were first turned up by a plough in 1857, at the foot of a demolished nuraghe called Serra Ilixi by locals. The find was published by Luigi Pigorini in 1904. Ingots from Serra Ilixi are on display at the National Archaeological Museum in Cagliari.

Between Nuragus and Nurallao there is the Giants' tomb of Aiodda, also from the Nuragic era.

References

External links

  Official website, with useful links under "Il paese", including useful addresses, history, archaeology and cultural heritage, festivals, churches etc. In Italian. Accessed July 2018.
  Nuragus at the official tourism website of Sardinia, with plenty of historical and archaeological information. Accessed July 2018.

Cities and towns in Sardinia